Coronado is one of the 67 Municipalities of Chihuahua, in northern Mexico. The municipal seat lies at Villa Coronado. The municipality covers an area of 1,756.1 km2. 

As of 2010, the municipality had a total population of 2,284  up from 2,046 as of 2005.

The municipality had 79 localities, the largest of which (with 2010 populations in parentheses) were: José Esteban Coronado (1,121) classified as rural.

Geography

Towns and villages

References

Municipalities of Chihuahua (state)